Right Now is the debut studio album by English girl group Atomic Kitten, released on 23 October 2000. The first release of the album originally peaked at number 39, putting the group at risk of being dropped by their record label. Following the departure of Kerry Katona in January 2001, the album was re-released on 6 August 2001 featuring vocals from new member Jenny Frost with additional new tracks featured on the album. The re-release was a success, peaking at number 1. Orchestral Manoeuvres in the Dark members and Atomic Kitten founders, Andy McCluskey and Stuart Kershaw, were among the album's principal songwriters.

Background
There are three versions of the album: the rare original Japanese release, the original UK edition which peaked at number thirty-nine, and the re-issue which topped the UK Albums Chart.

Atomic Kitten embarked on an Asian tour early on in their career and the album was first released in Japan. One of the early ideas for Atomic Kitten was that of an animated pop band influenced by Japanese anime and manga; leading to the original version of Right Now being highly bubblegum pop-oriented. Right Now was subsequently released in the United Kingdom on 23 October 2000 with a slightly modified track listing, but at first there were no plans to focus on the worldwide market. When Kerry Katona left the band during the promotion of "Whole Again", she was replaced by Jenny Frost. After the success of "Whole Again", the video was reshot and the album was re-released globally except for the United States with Frost's vocals added to a number of tracks, including a newly-recorded cover song, "Eternal Flame", as well as an additional single for the European, Australian, South African and New Zealand audiences, "You Are", giving the album a more mature pop sound.

A combination of tracks from this album and their next album Feels So Good were later included on a 2003 compilation album for the United States entitled Atomic Kitten.

Critical reception

Right Now received generally mixed reviews from music critics. AllMusic rated the album four out of five stars. Andrew Wagstaff from British music website NME called Right Now "a fizzing pop album; unashamedly fun, funky and shot through with class. Really. It’s a belter." He found that "instead of padding out the [latter] half an hour or so with boring, boring ballads and ill-conceived cover versions, there are at least four or five [more] songs on Right Now that would make great singles [...] Atomic Kitten have scored a brilliant victory for pure pop."

In a less enthusiastic review of the 2001 re-release of Right Now, his colleague Steven Wells wrote that "the fact is that Atomic Kitten have conquered the ickle girl, camp gay and dirty ole man markets and, for this week (and this week only), they are the cock-a-hoop, lustily crowing ding-dong King Kongs of Britpop. Which leaves only one (hugely irrelevant) question: is the rest of the album any frikkin’good? And the answer is (of course): No, don’t be daft. It’s shite." John Raftery, writing for RTÉ, found that "the album is a 14-track wade through the most risible, sugary mess you could ever find yourself in [...]The fact that three young women are performing it does not excuse the excruciating boredom and, frankly, disquiet, that listening to the orgasmic pleadings of these three creates [...] This album may be the first sign of the decline of Western civilisation as we know it – or just the worst record of the new millennium."

Chart performance
The original version of the album debuted at number thirty-nine, dropping to seventy-four in its second week. It spent a total of four weeks on the chart. It was re-issued due to the success of "Whole Again", where it topped the charts. It stayed in the top 100 for thirty-seven weeks. It was eventually certified double platinum. In Switzerland, the album debuted at number twenty-six. However, it wasn't until fourteen weeks later that the album reached its peak position of number four. This was around the time of the release of "Eternal Flame". It was certified gold. The album was also peaked at number four and was certified gold in Denmark. The album also reached the top ten in Germany, Austria, Belgium, and the Republic of Ireland. In New Zealand the album was certified platinum in and it peaked at number twelve, managing to spend twenty-five weeks on the chart. In Australia, the album peaked at number eighty-six, something the group was not expecting after "Whole Again" was certified double platinum. The album peaked at sixty-one in France.

Editions
There are three versions of the album: the original Japanese edition and the original UK edition were released with the original line-up featuring Kerry Katona, while the re-issue was released with the second line-up featuring Jenny Frost.

The original Japanese edition was released first and features rare versions of various tracks. The album features an exclusive song entitled "Real Life", the final mix version of "Holiday" (included as the B-side to the single "Whole Again" in demo form), demo versions of "Cradle", "I Want Your Love" (titled "All the Right Things"), and "Whole Again" (mainly featuring Katona speaking all of the verses), and an exclusive remix of "Right Now".

The original UK edition features a different track listing. Replacing "Holiday" and "Real Life" are "Get Real", "Turn Me On" and the fourth single "Follow Me". Also included are new versions of "I Want Your Love", "Cradle", and "Whole Again" (where the verses are sung by Natasha Hamilton and Liz McClarnon); the latter song reaching No. 1 on the UK Singles Chart when released as a single. The Japanese edition was re-released to match the UK edition and featured a bonus cover of "Daydream Believer".

Due to the success of "Whole Again" and Katona's departure from the group, a re-issue was released in the UK featuring a new track order and re-recordings of songs to feature Frost performing Katona's solo parts, such as "Right Now" and "Whole Again". "See Ya" and "I Want Your Love" were not re-recorded and were relegated to bonus tracks at the end of the album, while "Do What You Want" was excluded in favour of new songs "Tomorrow & Tonight", "You Are" and the re-issue's lead single (sixth overall), "Eternal Flame", which would become another big hit for the group, becoming their second No. 1. "Bye Now" was also re-recorded with a new arrangement and newly added vocals from Frost. "Cradle" was not re-recorded, but was slightly remixed for the reissue.

The UK re-issue is the only edition available through digital outlets like iTunes. However, this edition replaces the ballad-like album version of "Eternal Flame" with the commercial mid-tempo single version ("You Are" remains the album version).

Track listing

Notes
  signifies remix and additional production
  signifies additional production
  signifies a vocal producer
 1 features vocals by Jenny Frost
 2 features vocals by Kerry Katona

Charts

Weekly charts

Year-end charts

Certifications

Release history

References

External links

2000 debut albums
Atomic Kitten albums